The Armed Forces Conduct Medal is a military decoration of the Armed Forces of the Philippines.  It is awarded to enlisted personnel of the Armed Forces of the Philippines for serving two successive enlistment terms without record of punishment or disciplinary action.

See also
 Awards and decorations of the Armed Forces of the Philippines

References

Citations

Military awards and decorations of the Philippines